RTL Crime may refer to:

 RTL Crime (Croatian TV channel), the TV channel broadcasting in Croatia
 RTL Crime (Dutch TV channel), the TV channel broadcasting in the Netherlands
 RTL Crime (German TV channel), the TV channel broadcasting in Germany

See also
 RTL Group